Alessandro Pajola (born 9 November 1999) is an Italian professional basketball player for Virtus Bologna of the Italian Lega Basket Serie A (LBA) and the EuroLeague. He is also a member of the senior Italian national team. Pajola is widely known for his defensive ability.

Professional career

Virtus Bologna (2015–present)
Pajola joined Virtus Bologna in 2015, becoming an important supporting cast player in 2016–17, when the club was in Serie A2. On 19 June 2017, the Black V won the playoffs, beating Trieste by 3–0, thus returning to the top series after only one year. 

Pajola's importance in the team grown up season after season, becoming one of Virtus' most prominent player in 2020–21 season. In June 2021, after having knocked out 3–0 both Basket Treviso in the quarterfinals and New Basket Brindisi in the semifinals, on Virtus defeated 4–0 its historic rival Olimpia Milano in the national finals, winning its 16th national title and the first one after twenty years.

On 21 September 2021, the team won its second Supercup, defeating once again Olimpia Milano 90–84. After an outstanding game in the final, Pajola was named MVP of the tournament. Moreover, after having ousted Lietkabelis, Ulm and Valencia in the first three rounds of the playoffs, on 11 May 2022, Virtus defeated Frutti Extra Bursaspor by 80–67 at the Segafredo Arena, winning its first EuroCup and qualifying for the EuroLeague after 14 years. However, despite having ended the regular season at the first place and having ousted 3–0 both Pesaro and Tortona in the first two rounds of playoffs, Virtus was defeated 4–2 in the national finals by Olimpia Milan.

On 29 September 2022, after having ousted Milano in the semifinals, Virtus won its third Supercup, defeating 72–69 Banco di Sardegna Sassari and achieving a back-to-back, following the 2021 trophy.

Career statistics

Italian Championship

|-
| style="text-align:left;"| 2015–16
| style="text-align:left;"| Virtus Bologna
| 2 || 0 || 1.0 || .000 || .000 || .000 || .0 || .0 || .0 || .0 || .0 || .0
|-
| style="text-align:left;"| 2016–17
| style="text-align:left;"| Virtus Bologna
| 24 || 0 || 9.9 || .413 || .364 || .500 || 1.2 || .6 || .5 || .0 || 2.3 || 1.5
|-
| style="text-align:left;"| 2017–18
| style="text-align:left;"| Virtus Bologna
| 17 || 2 || 11.9 || .450 || .250 || .600 || 1.1 || .8 || .6 || .0 || 1.6 || 1.9
|-
| style="text-align:left;"| 2018–19
| style="text-align:left;"| Virtus Bologna
| 27 || 0 || 11.7 || .282 || .286 || .571 || 1.1 || 1.0 || .7 || .1 || 1.3 || .7
|-
| style="text-align:left;"| 2019–20
| style="text-align:left;"| Virtus Bologna
| 20 || 1 || 12.2 || .465 || .313 || .722 || 1.6 || 1.5 || .8 || .1 || 3.1 || 4.6

References

1999 births
Living people
Basketball players at the 2020 Summer Olympics
Italian men's basketball players
Lega Basket Serie A players
Olympic basketball players of Italy
Point guards
Virtus Bologna players